Annie Hulley (born 23 October 1955 in Wakefield, West Riding of Yorkshire) is an English television and stage actress who has appeared in the British soap-operas Emmerdale as Karen Moore and Coronation Street. Hulley wrote the play Dog Days as she was 'frustrated at the lack of roles for mature actresses'.

She trained at Bristol Old Vic Theatre School.

Television appearances

References
Notes

Bibliography

External links
 

English soap opera actresses
English television actresses
Living people
1955 births
Actors from Wakefield
Alumni of Bristol Old Vic Theatre School